The Nathan Warnick Apartments are a historic multifamily residential building at 57 Street in the Dorchester neighborhood of Boston, Massachusetts.  It was built about 1929, during an influx of Jewish immigrants to the area, and is a good example of Colonial Revival architecture in brick and stone.  The building was listed on the National Register of Historic Places in 2019.

Description and history
The Nathan Warnick Apartments are in a mainly residential area of Dorchester, at the southeast corner of Bradshaw and Bicknell Streets in the Franklin Field North area. It is a single building, four stories in height, built out of buff brick with a stone foundation, cast stone trim, and a flat roof.  The building is basically rectangular, with entrances near the centers of both street-facing facades, and an angled face at the street corner.  The Bicknell Street facade is four bays wide, with upper-story bays occupied by bands of two or three sash windows.  The main entrance is near the center of the facade, with similar bands of windows in the remaining ground-floor bays.  The entrance is framed by a modestly styled cast stone surround, which joins a stone belt separating the first and second floors.  The Bradshaw Street facade is longer, with a secondary entrance near its center, above which are paired recessed porches.

The apartment block was built in 1929 to a design by Bernard Levy, a locally prominent architect.  The neighborhood had seen an influx of Irish immigration during the late 19th and early 20th century, which was taken over by Jewish migration, primarily by second-generation Jews who grew up in Boston's North and West Ends.  Nathan Warnick, the builder, was a Jewish immigrant from Poland, and all of the building's early residents were Jews of Russian origin, either immigrants or first-generation descendants.

See also
National Register of Historic Places listings in southern Boston, Massachusetts

References

Apartment buildings in Boston
Apartment buildings on the National Register of Historic Places in Massachusetts
Dorchester, Boston
National Register of Historic Places in Boston